Vineeth Radhakrishnan (born 23 August 1969) is an Indian actor, classical dancer, voice artist and choreographer who primarily works in Malayalam, Tamil and Telugu language films. He has also starred in a few Kannada and Bollywood films. He has won several awards including 2 Kerala State Film Awards, Kalaimamani from Government of Tamil Nadu and Filmfare Award South.

Early life
Vineeth was born to K. T. Radhakrishnan and P. K. Shanthakumari on 23 August 1969 at Thalassery in Kannur district of North Kerala. He has a sister, Kavitha Dinesh. He studied at Good Shepherd International School, Ooty and St Joseph's Higher Secondary School, Thalassery. He pursued bachelors in commerce from The New College in 1991.

Vineeth is the nephew of Ramachandran Nair, the husband of actress Padmini of the Travancore sisters. His aunt, Padmini and her sister, Ragini convinced his parents to send him to dancing school.

He learned the Bharathanatyam form of dance at the age of six, and won several dance prizes while a student, including the first prize at the Kerala State Youth festival for four years in a row and winning the top prize of "Kalaprathibha" in 1986.

Film career

Vineeth entered films with the I. V. Sasi film Idanilangal in 1985, and caught the public eye with his second film, Nakhakshathangal, in 1986. His dancing skills were prominently displayed in several films as well. He played the lead characters in Idanazhiyil Oru Kaalocha (1987), a story by poet Balachandran Chullikkadu and Oru Muthassi Katha (1988) directed by Priyadarshan. Aavarampoo (1992), the Tamil remake of Thakara changed everything for Vineeth directed by Bharathan. As soon as Aavarampoo ended, Hariharan called him for Sargam (1992), in which he played a musical genius. Suddenly Vineeth was doing multiple films in Malayalam and Tamil. Kabooliwala (1994) and Manathe Vellitheru (1994) became two turning points in his Malayalam career, one establishing him as a young romantic hero, the other proving he could handle negative shades really well. Though his films impressed both critics and front benchers, he did not become a super hero, a sought after actor. He had appeared in maximum Malayalam films. But his career did not pick up as expected.

His roles in successful Tamil films also include Gentleman (1993), Pudhiya Mugam (1993), Jaathi Malli (1993) and May Maadham (1994). Among other projects came Kadhal Desam (1996), where Vineeth and Abbas played college students in love with the same woman, played by Tabu. The movie, with its themes of friendship and romance and the music of A. R. Rahman, became very popular. He has acted in several well received films since then in all South Indian languages. In spite of his success in films, he still considers dance as his first love and is undergoing advanced training in Bharatanatyam and participates in several dance programmes all over the world as well as the Surya Dance Festival. He has worked in several Telugu films such as Aaro Pranam (1997), Maa Annayya (2000), Ammayi Kosam (2001), Nee Premakai (2002) and Lahiri Lahiri Lahirilo (2002). Vineeth, who disappeared from both Tamil and Malayalam cinema, made a comeback with Rajinikanth starrer Chandramukhi (2005). He played the same role in the Hindi version of Bhool Bhulaiyaa (2007) as well.  He won the Kerala State Film Award for Best Choreography for Kambhoji in 2017. Vineeth's last film release was the G. V. Prakash Kumar starrer Sarvam Thaala Mayam (2019) in Tamil. It was a musical drama that was written and directed by Rajiv Menon. Actor singer Krishnachandran dubbed for Vineeth in most of his early movies. Ironically, Vineeth won the Kerala State Film Award for Best Dubbing Artist in 2020 for giving voice to Vivek Oberoi's character in Lucifer, actor Prithviraj’s first as a director. In Malayalam, he was seen in Kavya Prakash's debut film Vaanku (2021), based on a story by Unni R. In Marakkar: Lion of the Arabian Sea, he dubbed for the character played by Tamil star Arjun Sarja. Vineeth won the award for his dubbing.

Personal life
Vineeth married Priscilla Menon, who hails from Telicherry on August 2004. They live in Chennai, and a daughter was born to them in 2006.

Awards and nominations
 1986 - Kalaprathibha - Kerala School Kalolsavam
 1992 - Best New Face award by Film Fan's Association in Tamil Nadu for Aavarampoo
 1992 - Kerala Film Critics Association Awards Second Best Actor award for Daivathinte Vikrithikal and Sargam
 1993 - Supporting Actor award by Film Fan's Association in Tamil Nadu for Jathi Malli and Pudhiya Mugam
 2006 - Yuvakala Bharathi award - Bharath Kalachar
 2009 - Kalaimamani Award from Government of Tamil Nadu 
 2013 - Asiavision Awards for Best Supporting Actor
 2013 - Filmfare Award for Best Supporting Actor – Malayalam - Nominated for Bavuttiyude Namathil
 2017 - Kerala State Film Award for Best Choreography - Kambhoji for the song "Chenthar Nermukhi"
 2020 - Kerala State Film Award for Best Dubbing Artist - Lucifer (dubbed for Vivek Oberoi), Marakkar: Arabikadalinte Simham (dubbed for Arjun Sarja)

Filmography

Films in Malayalam

Others language films

Dubbing

References

External links

 Actor Vineeth - Official Website
 

1969 births
Living people
Bharatanatyam exponents
Performers of Indian classical dance
Male actors from Kerala
People from Thalassery
Male actors in Malayalam cinema
Male actors in Tamil cinema
Male actors in Kannada cinema
Male actors in Telugu cinema
Indian male film actors
Recipients of the Kalaimamani Award
20th-century Indian dancers
Indian male dancers
20th-century Indian male actors
21st-century Indian dancers
21st-century Indian male actors
Dancers from Kerala